Emblemariopsis ruetzleri is a species of chaenopsid blenny found around Belize, in the western central Atlantic ocean. The specific name honours Klaus Ruetzler, Curator of Invertebrate Zoology at the National Museum of Natural History.

References
 Tyler, D.M. and J.C. Tyler  1997 (15 Apr.) A new species of chaenopsid fish, Emblemariopsis ruetzleri, from the western Caribbean off Belize (Blennioidei), with notes on its life history. Proceedings of the Biological Society of Washington v. 110 (no. 1): 24–38.

ruetzleri
Fish described in 1997